Vladimir Zhutenkov (2 April 1962 – 14 November 2021) was a Russian businessman and politician. A member of United Russia, he served in the State Duma from 2016 to 2017.

References

1962 births
2021 deaths
21st-century Russian politicians
Seventh convocation members of the State Duma (Russian Federation)
United Russia politicians
People from Bryansk